This is a list of commentators on the works of Aristotle who wrote in Latin, from the Late Antique to the last years of the European Middle Ages. The names are given in their Latin forms.

Sources: Taken from Charles H. Lohr, Commentateurs d'Aristote au Moyen-Âge Latin (1988).

Aegidius Romanus
Albertus Magnus
Albertus de Saxonia
Andreas de Biliis: Commentaries on Metaphysics and On the Heavens book 4.
Bartholomaeus de Brugis
Blasius Pelacanus de Parma
Boethius
Boethius de Dacia
Bonaventura
Caietanus de Thienis
Christophorus Landinus
Franciscus de Mayronis de Digna
Franciscus Rubeus de Marchia
Georgius Trapezuntius
Godefridus de Fontibus
Gualterus de Burley
Guillelmus de Conchis
Guillelmus de Heytesbury
Guillelmus de Ockham
Guillelmus de Shirwode
Heimericus de Campo
Henricus de Gandavo
Henricus Heinbuche de Langenstein
Henricus Totting de Oyta
Hermannus Alemannus
Jacobus Capocci de Viterbio
Jacobus Veneticus
Johannes Argyropulus
Johannes Buridanus
Johannes Duns Scotus
Johannes de Glogovia
Johannes de Janduno
Johannes Pecham
Johannes Saresburiensis
Johannes Versoris
Johannes Wyclif
Laurentius Vallensis
Leonardus Bruni Aretinus
Marsilius de Inghen
Marsilius Mainardinus
Michael Scotus
Nicolaus Oresme: Livre de Politiques
Nicolettus Vernias Theatinus
Paulus Nicolettus Venetus
Petrus Abaelardus
Petrus de Abano
Petrus de Alliaco
Petrus de Alvernia
Petrus Hispanus
Petrus Martinez de Osma
Radulphus Reginaldi Britonis
Remigius de Florentia
Richardus de Lavenham commentaries on the Physics and Ethics
Robertus Grosseteste
Robertus de Kilwardby
Rogerus Bacon
Sigerus de Brabantia
Simon de Faversham
Stephanus Tempier
Theodoricus Brito
Thomas de Aquino
Thomas Bradwardinus
Thomas de Erfordia
Thomas de Sutton

See also
List of Renaissance commentators on Aristotle

Notes

 
medieval Latin
Latin commentators on Aristotle
Medieval Latin commentators on Aristotle